is a Japanese manga artist. In 1989, she graduated from the Department of Visual Communication Design at Musashino Art University.

She is friends with fellow manga artist Nobuyuki Fukumoto. When she appeared on "Big Comic Superior Presents: The 6th Saibara Rieko's Life Art Skill Showdown", she revealed that she had known him for 20 years, and wrote that he has been "a handsome, serious, gentle-mannered and lovely man ever since then", but he was ignored by female manga artists because of his unpopular status.

Works

Manga
  (serialized in Weekly Young Sunday, 1988–1994)
  (serialized in Manga Club, 1989–1997)
  (co-author, serialized in Weekly Asahi, 1992–1994)
  (serialized in Big Comic Spirits, 1995–1998)
  (serialized in the Mainichi Shimbun, 2002–2017)
  (serialized in Yasei Jidai, 2004–2006)
  (serialized in Shinchosha 45, 2004–2006)
  (serialized in Big Comic Superior, 2004)
  (serialized in Big Comic Superior, 2005)
  (serialized in Big Comic Superior, 2005)
  (serialized in Big Comic Superior, 2014–present)
  (serialized in the Mainichi Shimbun, 2017–present)

Video games
  (Super Famicom, 1995)
  (PlayStation, 1998)
  (PlayStation, 2000)
  (Game Boy Advance, 2001)

Notes

References

Further reading
 Several pages of  translated into English at The Japan Times (defunct; link via the Wayback Machine)

External links

 Official blog 
  
 

1964 births
Female comics writers
Japanese female comics artists
Japanese women writers
Living people
Manga artists from Kōchi Prefecture